The 2013 Georgia Southern Eagles football team represented Georgia Southern University in the 2013 NCAA Division I FCS football season. They were led by fourth-year head coach Jeff Monken and played their home games at Paulson Stadium. They were a member of the Southern Conference. This was Georgia Southern's final year in the Southern Conference and the FCS. They joined the FBS and the Sun Belt Conference for the 2014 season. They finished the season 7–4, 4–4 in SoCon play to finish in a four-way tie for fourth place.

In the final game of the season, against the Florida Gators, the Eagles upset the FBS Gators, 26–20, without completing a pass. The win marked the first time a FCS team defeated the Gators.

At the end of the season, head coach Jeff Monken resigned to become the head coach at Army.

On July 22, 2016, the university announced that it was ordered by the NCAA to vacate two wins from the 2013 season and one win from the 2014 season, due to academically ineligible student-athletes participating in those games. The wins affected in the 2013 season were against the Savannah State Tigers and St. Francis Red Flash.

Schedule

Ranking movements

Ineligible for FCS Coaches Poll

References

Georgia Southern
Georgia Southern Eagles football seasons
Georgia Southern Eagles football